The 2000–01 FA Trophy was the thirty-second season of the FA Trophy.

The competition was won by Essex-side Canvey Island, who defeated Forest Green Rovers 1–0 in the Final at Villa Park, Birmingham.

1st round

Ties

Replays

2nd round

Ties

Replays

3rd round
The teams from Football Conference entered in this round.

Ties

Replays

4th round

Ties

Replays

5th round

Ties

Replays

Quarter finals

Ties

Semi finals

First leg

Second leg

Final

Tie

References

General
 Football Club History Database: FA Trophy 2000-01

Specific

2000–01 domestic association football cups
League
2000-01